Alexander G. Severance Sr. (June 3, 1905 – April 1, 1985) was an American  basketball and  baseball coach.  Born in New York City, Severance graduated from Villanova University in 1929 and received his J.D. from Temple University Beasley School of Law in 1932.  In addition to coaching basketball for Villanova, Severance was a professor of business law at the university.

Severance coached the Villanova Wildcats men's basketball team for 25 seasons (1936–1961), compiling a 413–201 (.673) record. Among his former players is Naismith Memorial Basketball Hall of Fame member Paul Arizin.  Severance coached his team to the first Final Four of the NCAA tournament in 1939.  His teams also played in the NCAA Tournament in 1949 and 1955.  Under his leadership, Villanova was selected for the National Invitation Tournament (NIT) in 1959 and 1960.

Severance died on the morning of April 1, 1985, in Lexington, Kentucky, on the day Villanova won the 1985 NCAA Division I men's basketball tournament.  The championship game was played at Rupp Arena in Lexington.

Head coaching record

Basketball

See also
 List of NCAA Division I Men's Final Four appearances by coach

References

1905 births
1985 deaths
American men's basketball coaches
American men's basketball players
Basketball coaches from New York (state)
Basketball players from New York City
Temple University alumni
Villanova University faculty
Villanova Wildcats baseball coaches
Villanova Wildcats men's basketball coaches
Villanova Wildcats men's basketball players
Eastern Basketball Association coaches